Via Imperii (Imperial Road) was one of the most important of a class of roads known collectively as imperial roads of the Holy Roman Empire. This old trade route ran in a south–north direction from Venice on the Adriatic Sea and Verona in the Kingdom of Italy across the Brenner Pass through Germany to the Baltic coast passing the following cities:
 Innsbruck in the County of Tyrol
 Augsburg in the Prince-Bishopric of Augsburg
 the Imperial city of Nuremberg
 Bayreuth, Berneck, Münchberg and Hof in the Principality of Bayreuth
 Plauen, Mylau and Reichenbach in the Vogtland region
 Zwickau, Altenburg, Regis, Borna, Markkleeberg and Connewitz in the Margraviate of Meissen
 Leipzig – intersection with east–west Via Regia
 Wittenberg in Saxe-Wittenberg
 Cölln/Berlin, capital of Brandenburg
 Bernau bei Berlin
 Stettin in the Duchy of Pomerania
The cities on the route held the privilege of staple right, merchants were obliged to use the toll road and in turn enjoyed protection by the Imperial authority under the terms of the Landfrieden.

Parts of the historic route are today marked by the Italian Strada Statale No. 12, the Austrian Landesstraßen B 182 and B 177 and the German Bundesstraße 2.

References

Christoph Kühn: Die Via Imperii als Pilgerstraße. in: Unterwegs im Zeichen der Muschel. Rundbrief der Fränkischen St. Jakobus-Gesellschaft Würzburg, Nr. 52, January 2005, p. 13-14

Medieval roads and tracks
Economy of the Holy Roman Empire